Felipe Pirela (1941–1972) was a Venezuelan bolero singer. He was murdered in San Juan, Puerto Rico.

Discography
Some of Pirela's albums are out of print, but available on CD. No EP's or simple format discs are available.

References

20th-century Venezuelan male singers
People from Maracaibo
1941 births
1972 deaths
1972 murders in Puerto Rico